Chlidonoptera is an African genus of praying mantis in the family Hymenopodidae and tribe Hymenopodini.

See also
List of mantis genera and species

References

 
Mantodea genera